A modern development and belief that the progress of knowledge is the result of distinct and independent spheres, and that knowledge in one discipline has little connection with knowledge in another discipline. Thus, specialists pursue their work in isolation from one another rather than as aspects of a unity or whole.

See also
 Integrated human studies, an example of a counter approach to specialization

Knowledge